Babulugaadi Debba is a 1981 Telugu-language action drama film directed by K. Vasu starring Krishnam Raju, Sridevi and Raadhika. The soundtrack was composed by J. V. Raghavulu.

Cast
Krishnam Raju as Venu/Babulu
Sridevi as Radha
Raadhika as Gowri
Prabhakar Reddy
Jaggayya as Jagannath
Rao Gopal Rao
Tyagaraju as Surendra
Giri Babu as Rambabu
Sarathi as Ramu
Baby Meena as Radha
Sakshi Ranga Rao as Panakalu
Suthivelu
Jyothi Lakshmi

References 

1984 films
1980s action drama films
Indian action drama films
Films scored by J. V. Raghavulu
1980s Telugu-language films
1984 drama films
Films directed by K. Vasu